Yavarí may refer to:

 Yavari (ship), a ship commissioned  by the Peruvian government in 1861 for use on Lake Titicaca
 Yavarí or Javary River, a tributary of the Amazon that forms the boundary between Brazil and Peru for more than